Tampere Orthodox Church (also known as the Church of the Alexander Nevsky and the Saint Nicholas) is an Eastern Orthodox church in Tampere, Finland, located in the Kyttälä city district. It is dedicated to Saint Alexander Nevsky and to Saint Nicholas. Tampere Orthodox Church was completed in 1899 to the design of the Russian military architect T. U. Yazukov.

References 

Finnish Orthodox churches
Buildings and structures in Tampere
Kyttälä